Nemmeli, is one of the Village in Sirkazhi Taluk in Mayiladuthurai district in Tamil Nadu State. Nemmeli is located 3.1 km distance from its Taluk Main Town Sirkazhi. Nemmeli is 21 km far from its District Main City Mayiladuthurai . It is 211 km far from its State Main City Chennai .

Geography

Transportation

Nemmeli is on the way between Sirkazhi and Vadarankam. Buses from sirkazhi bus stand is available (Bus Route: 8, 8 A Sirkazhi Bus Stand to Vadarankam). Mini Buses are also available from Kollidam Mukkuttu. Auto Fare is around Rs.80 from sirkazhi bus stand.

Temples
Sri Visalakshi sametha Viswanathar Temple

Lord Shani came to Nemmeli and worshipped Varuna Linga, and by the blessings of Sri Visalakshi (sametha Sri Viswanathar) he got complete cure over the disease. There is holy pond near the temple where lord shani performed bath, and worshipped Shiva and attained peace. Nimmathi means peace in Tamil, and there are few sayings that Nimmathi became Nemmeli in time. There is another saying that, Nemmeli came from "Nelveli" i.e. land rich in rice cultivations.

The construction of the temple date back to the later chola period. The temple is believed to be 500 years old. But exact history can't be predicted as there is no scripture available.
Sri Shasta (deity) temple and Aiyanar temple are situated near this temple.

Villages in Mayiladuthurai district